This is a list of electoral results for the Electoral district of Yilgarn-Coolgardie in Western Australian state elections.

Members for Yilgarn-Coolgardie

Election results

Elections in the 1940s

Elections in the 1930s

References

Western Australian state electoral results by district